is a member of the all-female manga-creating team CLAMP. She is the director of the team and is primarily responsible for writing the stories and scripts for CLAMP's various works.

As part of CLAMP's 15th Anniversary, each of the four members changed their names reportedly because they wanted to try out the new monikers. Ohkawa still used her previous name for some of the scripts she wrote for animated series.

Ohkawa announced in her blog that from March 1, 2008, she should be addressed as Nanase Ohkawa again.

Works

Manga
Ohkawa has written all of the CLAMP manga series since 1980s.

Anime
Ohkawa has also contributed majority of the anime adaptations of CLAMP's manga series:

Credited as "Ageha Ohkawa"

References

External links

 
Nanase Ohkawa at IMDb.com

Clamp (manga artists)
Women manga artists
Japanese female comics artists
Female comics writers
Japanese women artists
Japanese women writers
Japanese writers
Living people
1967 births
Women television writers
Japanese screenwriters